The India cricket team toured New Zealand, playing a five-match One Day International (ODI) series and two Test matches against the New Zealand national team from 19 January to 18 February 2014.

Squads

ODI series

1st ODI

2nd ODI

3rd ODI

4th ODI

5th ODI

Tour matches

Test series

1st Test

2nd Test

References

External links
 India in New Zealand 2013-14 on Wisden India
 India in New Zealand on ESPNcricinfo

Indian cricket tours of New Zealand
2013–14 New Zealand cricket season
International cricket competitions in 2013–14
2014 in New Zealand cricket
2014 in Indian cricket